Massimo, also Massimino, and Massimine is a masculine Italian given name. Notable people with the name include:

Given name:
Massimo Agostinelli (Max Agos) (born 1987), Swiss based Italian American artist, entrepreneur and activist
Massimo Agostini (born 1964), Italian football manager and former striker
Massimo Alioto (born 1972), associate professor of Electrical and Computer Engineering at the National University of Singapore
Massimo Allevi (born 1969), former Italian pole vaulter
Massimo Ambrosini Cavaliere OMRI (born 1977), Italian former professional footballer
Massimo De Ambrosis (born 1964), Italian actor and voice actor
Massimo Amfiteatrof (1907–1990), Russian-born Italian cellist
Paolo Massimo Antici (1924–2003), Italian diplomat, founder of the Antici Group
Massimo Aparo (born 1953), Italian nuclear engineer
Massimo Apollonio (born 1970), former Italian racing cyclist
Massimo Ardinghi (born 1971), former professional tennis player from Italy
Massimo Arduini (born 1960), Italian auto tourism racing driver
Massimo Livi Bacci (November 9, 1936) is an Italian professor of Demography
Massimo Bacigalupo (born 1947), experimental filmmaker, scholar, translator of poetry, essayist, literary critic
Massimo Baistrocchi (1942–2012), Italian writer, artist, freelance journalist, Italy's Ambassador to Namibia
Massimo Ballestrero (born 1901), Italian rowing coxswain
Massimo Barbolini(born 1964), Italian volleyball coach
Massimo Barbuti (born 1958), Italian former football player and manager
Massimo Bartolini (born 1962), Italian artist
Massimo Battara (born 1963), Italian football coach and a former player
Massimo Beghetto (born 1968), Italian football former coach and former player
Massimo Belardinelli (1938–2007), Italian comic artist
Massimo Berdini (born 1958), retired Italian football player
Massimo Bergami (born 1964), full professor of organizational behavior at the University of Bologna
Massimo Bergamin (born 1964), Italian politician
Massimo Berta (1949–2020), Italian professional footballer
Massimo Bertagnoli (born 1999), Italian football player
Massimo Bertocchi (born 1985), male decathlete from Canada
Massimo Bertolini (born 1974), retired professional tennis player from Italy
Massimo de Bertolis (born 1975), Italian professional cross-country mountain biker
Massimo Biolcati (born 1972), Swedish-Italian-American jazz bassist
Massimo Birindelli (born 1956), Italian sports shooter
Massimo Bitonci (born 1965), Italian Venetist politician
Massimo Bogana, Italian bobsledder
Massimo Bogianckino (1922–2009), Italian pianist, artistic director, and politician
Massimo Boldi (born 1945), Italian stand-up comedian and actor
Massimo Bonanni (born 1982), Italian football coach and a former player
Massimo Bonetti (born 1951), Italian actor and director
Massimo Bonini (born 1959), Sammarinese professional football player and coach
Massimo Boninsegni (born 1963), Italian-Canadian theoretical condensed matter physicist
Massimo Bonomi (born 1967), Italian rugby union player and a sports manager
Massimo Bontempelli (1878–1960), Italian poet, playwright, novelist and composer
Massimo Borgobello (born 1971), retired Italian footballer
Massimo Boscatto (born 1971), former professional tennis player from Italy
 Massimo Bottura (born 1962), Italian restaurateur
 Massimo Brambati (born 1966), Italian footballer
 Massimo Brancaccio (1965–2005), Italian drag queen performer, stage name Billy More
 Massimo Bray (born 1959), Italian intellectual and politician
Massimo Briaschi (born 1958), Italian professional footballer and FIFA sports agent
Massimo Brunelli (born 1961), Italian former cyclist
Massimo Bruno (born 1993), Belgian footballer
Massimo Bruschini (1942–1975), Italian boxer
 Massimo Bubola (born 1954), Italian singer-songwriter
Massimo Bulleri (born 1977), Italian professional basketball player
Massimo Busacca (born 1969), Swiss former football referee
Massimo Cacciari (born 1944), Italian philosopher, politician and public intellectual
Fabio Massimo Cacciatori (born 1961), entrepreneur and film producer
Massimo Calearo (born 1955), Italian entrepreneur and former politician
Massimo Calvelli (born 1974), Italian sports executive and former professional tennis player
Massimo Campigli (1895–1971), Italian painter and journalist
Massimo Canevacci (born 1942), Italian academic, ethnographer and critical thinker
Massimo Cannizzaro (born 1981), Italian football coach and former player
Massimo Capra (born 1960), Italian-born Canadian restauranteur, cookbook author, celebrity chef
Massimo De Carlo, Italian art dealer, with gallery spaces in Milan, London, and Hong Kong
Massimo Carlotto (born 1956), Italian writer and playwright
Massimo Carmassi (born 1943), Italian architect
Massimo Carminati (born 1958), Italian underworld figure
Massimo Carnevale (born 1967), Italian cartoonist and illustrator
Massimo Carpegna (born 1955), Italian conductor
Massimo Carraro (born 1959), Italian university professor, entrepreneur and politician from Veneto
Massimo Carrera (born 1964), Italian professional football manager and former player
Massimo Cartasegna (1885–1964), Italian athlete who competed at the 1908 Summer Olympics in London
Massimo Casanova (born 1970), Italian politician and MEP
Massimo Castagna (born 1961), Italian volleyball player
Fabio Massimo Castaldo (born 1985), Italian politician and MEP
Massimo Castellani (born 1961), Italian diver
Massimo Di Cataldo (born 1968), Italian singer-songwriter and actor
Massimo Cavaliere (born 1962), Italian fencer
Massimo Ceccaroni (born 1968), retired Swiss-Italian footballer
Massimo Ceccherini (born 1965), Italian actor, film director, comedian and screenwriter
Massimo Ceciliani (born 1997), Italian rugby union player
Massimo Cellino (born 1956), Italian entrepreneur and football club owner
Massimo Cenci (born 1967), politician of San Marino
Massimo Chessa (born 1988), professional Italian basketball player
Massimo Cialente (born 1952), Italian politician and doctor
Massimo Ciaramella (born 1970), retired Italian professional baseball infielder
Massimo Ciavarro (born 1957), Italian actor and television personality
Massimo Cierro (born 1964), professional tennis player from Italy
Massimo Ciocci (born 1968), Italian professional football player and manager
Massimo Cioffi (born 1997), Italian rugby union player
Massimo Citi (born 1955), Italian science fiction writer and reviewer
Massimo Coda (born 1988), Italian professional footballer
Massimo Codol (born 1973), Italian former racing cyclist
Massimo Colaci (born 1985), Italian volleyball player
Massimo Colomba (born 1977), Swiss footballer
Massimo Consoli (1945–2007), known as the father of the Italian gay movement
Massimo Bruni Corvino (died 1522), Roman Catholic prelate, Bishop of Isernia
Massimo Corvo (born 1959), Italian actor and voice actor
Massimo Cosmelli (born 1943), retired Italian basketball player
Massimo Costantini (born 1958), Italian table tennis player
 Massimo Crippa (born 1965), Italian footballer
Massimo Cristaldi (1956–2022), Italian film producer
Massimo Cuttitta (1966–2021), Italian professional rugby union player and coach
Massimo D'Alelio (1916–1998), Italian bridge player
 Massimo D'Alema (born 1949), Italian politician
Massimo Dallamano (1917–1976), Italian director and director of photography
Massimo D'Amico (born 1979), Italian artist working in the Czech Republic
Massimo Dapporto (born 1945), Italian actor and voice actor
Massimo Di Deco, Italian coxswain
Massimo Dell'Acqua (born 1979), former professional tennis player from Italy
Massimo Demarin (born 1979), Croatian former professional cyclist
Massimo Depaoli (born 1959), Italian politician
Massimo Dobrovic, Istrian Italian actor
Massimo Di Domenico (born 1945), former professional tennis player from Italy
Massimo Donadi (born 1963), Italian politician
Massimo Donati (born 1981), Italian football coach, pundit and former professional player
Massimo Donati (cyclist) (born 1967), Italian former professional racing cyclist
Massimo Drago (born 1971), Italian professional football coach and a former player
Massimo Drisaldi, Italian former tennis player
Massimo Egidi (born 1942) is an Italian economist
Massimo Ellul, Maltese businessman active in the voluntary organisation field
Massimo Fabbrizi (born 1977), Italian professional target shooter
Massimo Faggioli (born 1970), Italian Church historian, professor of theology and religious studies at Villanova University
Massimo Fagioli (1931–2017), Italian psychiatrist and psychotherapist
Massimo Federici (born 1956), Italian politician
Massimo Felisatti (1932–2016), Italian novelist, essayist, screenwriter, and director
Massimo Fenati (born 1969), Italian comic book artist, illustrator and animator
Massimo Ferrin (born 1998), Canadian professional soccer player
Massimo Ficcadenti (born 1967), Italian football manager and former midfielder
Massimo Fink (1896–1956), Italian bobsledder
Massimo Florioli (born 1972), Italian professional golfer
Massimo Altomare (m:A Fog) (born 1979), heavy metal musician
Massimo Fondelli (born 1954), Italian former water polo player
Pier Massimo Forni (1951–2018), Italian professor at Johns Hopkins University
Massimo Fornoni (born 1989), Italian footballer
Massimo Foschi (born 1938), Italian actor and voice actor
Massimo Franciosa (1924–1998), Italian screenwriter and film director
Massimo Franco (born 1954), Italian journalist, author, edits the Italian newspaper Corriere della Sera
Massimo Freccia (1906–2004), Italian American conductor
Massimo Gadda (born 1963), Italian professional football coach and former player
Massimo Ganci (born 1981), Italian footballer
Massimo Garavaglia (born 1968), Italian politician, Italian Minister of Tourism
Massimo Gauci (1774–1854), Maltese lithographer and painter active in UK
Massimo Gazzoli (born 1975), former Italian football goalkeeper
Massimo Di Gesu (born 1970), Italian composer
Massimo Ghini (born 1954), Italian actor
Massimo Iosa Ghini (born 1959), Italian architect, designer and professor
Massimo Ghirotto (born 1961), Italian former road bicycle racer
Massimo Giacomini (born 1939), retired Italian football player and football manager
Massimo Giacoppo (born 1983), Italian water polo player, member of Olympic medallist team
Massimo Severo Giannini (1915–2000), Italian politician and jurist
Massimo Giletti (born 1962), Italian television host and journalist
Massimo Giordano (born 1971), Italian-born operatic tenor
Massimo Giorgetti (born 1959), Italian politician
Massimo Di Giorgio (born 1958), former Italian high jumper
Massimo Giovanelli (born 1967), former Italian rugby union player
Massimo Girotti (1918–2003), Italian film actor whose career spanned seven decades
Massimo Giuliani (born 1951), Italian actor and voice actor
Massimo Giunti (born 1974), former Italian cyclist
Massimo Giustetti (1926–2012), the Catholic bishop of the Diocese of Biella, Italy
Massimo Gobbi (born 1980), Italian retired footballer
Massimo Goh (born 1999), Italian footballer
Massimo Gotti (born 1986), Italian former professional footballer
Massimo Gramellini (born 1960), Italian writer and journalist working at Corriere della Sera
Massimo Graziato (born 1988), Italian former professional road cyclist
Massimo Grima (born 1979), professional retired footballer
Massimo Guglielmi (born 1970), Italian lightweight rower
Massimo Guiggiani (born 1956), Italian mechanical engineer, professor of applied mechanics at the Università di Pisa
Massimo Introvigne (born 1955), Italian Roman Catholic sociologist of religion and intellectual property attorney
Massimo Di Ioia (born 1987), Canadian former soccer player
Massimo Lana (born 1962), Italian lightweight rower
Umberto Massimo Lattuca (born 1959), retired Italian professional football player
Massimo Andrea Leggeri (born 1950), Italian diplomat
Massimo Liverani (born 1961), Italian rally driver and co-driver
Massimo Lodolo (born 1959), Italian actor and voice actor
Massimo Lombardo (born 1973), former Swiss footballer
Massimo Lonardi (born 1953), Italian lutenist
Massimo Lopez (born 1952), Italian actor, voice actor, comedian, impressionist
Massimo Lotti (born 1969), Italian footballer
Massimo Loviso (born 1984), Italian footballer
Massimo De Luca (born 1987), Italian futsal player
 Massimo Luongo (born 1992), Australian footballer
Massimo Maccarone (born 1979), Italian football coach and former player
Massimo Maffezzoli (born 1976), Italian basketball head coach
Massimo Magnani (born 1951), former Italian marathon runner
Massimo Mallegni (born 1968), Italian politician
Massimo Manca (born 1964), former Italian-born American football kicker
Valerio Massimo Manfredi (born 1943), Italian historian, writer, essayist, archaeologist and journalist
Massimo Mannelli (born 1956), Italian professional golfer
Massimo Marazzina (born 1974), Italian former professional footballer
Massimo Marchese (born 1965), Italian musician, lutenist, theorbist and recording artist
Massimo Marchiori (born 1970), Italian mathematician and computer scientist
Massimo Marconcini (born 1968), Italian rower
Massimo Margiotta (born 1977), Italian-Venezuelan former professional footballer
Massimo Marino (born 1954), Italian former cyclist
Massimo Marino (TV presenter) (1960–2019), Italian television presenter and actor
Massimo Mariotti (born 1961), retired Swiss footballer
Massimo De Martin (born 1983), Italian professional football player
Massimo Martino (born 1990), Luxembourgian football player
Massimo Mascioletti (born 1958), Italian rugby union coach and a former player
Massimo Masini (born 1945), former Italian professional basketball player and coach
Massimo Massimi (1877–1954), Italian Roman Catholic cardinal
Massimo Mattioli (1943–2019), Italian artist and cartoonist
Massimo Maugeri, Italian writer, journalist and radio presenter
Massimo Mauro (born 1962), Italian politician and a former professional football player
Massimo Mazzucco (born 1954), Italian filmmaker
Massimo Meola (born 1953), Italian former footballer
Massimo Mida (1917–1992), Italian screenwriter and film director
Massimo Mila (1910–1988), Italian musicologist, music critic, intellectual and anti-fascist
Massimo Milano (born 1967), ethnomusicologist, critic and sound experimentalist
Massimo Minervin (born 1939), Italian Olympic sailor
Massimo Minetti (born 1978), Italian footballer
Massimo Mirabelli (born 1991), Canadian soccer player
Massimo Moia (born 1987), Belgian football midfielder
Massimo Mollica (1929–2013), Italian actor and stage director
Massimo Mongai (1950–2016), Italian author of science fiction
Massimo Montanari, Professor of Medieval History at Bologna University
Massimo Monti (born 1962), Italian racing driver
Massimo Morales (born 1964), Italian football manager
Massimo Morante (1952–2022), Italian musician, guitar player for Goblin
Massimo Moratti (born 1945), Italian billionaire petroleum businessman
Massimo Moriconi (canoeist) (born 1956), Italian sprint canoeist
Massimo Moriconi (musician) (born 1955), Italian bassist
Massimo Morsello (1958–2001), Italian fascist political and singer-songwriter
Massimo Murdocca (born 1984), Australian professional soccer player
Massimo Mutarelli (born 1978), Italian retired football midfielder
Massimo Natili (1935–2017), racing driver from Italy
Massimo Nistri (born 1955), Italian Olympic backstroke swimmer
Massimo Oberti (1901–1972), Italian sailor
 Massimo Oddo (born 1976), Italian footballer
Massimo Orlando (born 1971), Italian professional football coach and a former player
Massimo Ornatelli (born 1986), Italian footballer
Massimo Osti (1944–2005), Italian garment engineer and fashion designer
Massimo Pacetti (born 1962), Canadian politician from Quebec
Massimo Paci (born 1978), Italian football coach and a former player
Massimo Paganin (born 1970), Italian former professional footballer
Massimo Palanca (born 1953), Italy) is an Italian former football striker
Massimo Palazzi (born 1961), the secretary general of the Italian Muslim Assembly, Khalifah for Europe of the Qadiri Sufi Order
Massimo Pallottino (1909–1995), Italian archaeologist specializing in Etruscan civilization and art
Massimo Palombella (born 1967), Italian Salesian priest and director of the Cappella Musicale Pontificia Sistina
Massimo Panizzi (born 1962), Italian Army Major General, Italian Deputy Military Representative to the NATO Military Committee
Massimo Paradiso (born 1968), Italian rower
Massimo Cantini Parrini (born 1971), Italian costume designer
Massimo Parziani (born 1992), Italian Grand Prix motorcycle racer
Massimo Pedrazzini (born 1958), Italian football coach and former player
Massimo Pellegrini (born 1966), retired Italian professional footballer
Massimo Pianforini (1890–1966), Italian film and television actor
 Massimo Pigliucci (born 1964), Italian-American Philosopher
Massimo Pigoli (born 1958), Italian auto racing driver
Massimo Piloni (born 1948), Italian professional football coach and a former player
Massimo Pilotti (1879–1962), Italian jurist and judge
Massimo Pirri (1945–2001), Italian film director and screenwriter
Massimo del Pizzo, Italian science fiction writer and critic
Massimo Podenzana (born 1961), Italian former road racing cyclist
Massimo Podestà, Italian artist and architect
 Massimo Polidoro (born 1969), an Italian psychologist, writer, journalist, co-founder and executive director of CICAP
Massimo Popolizio (born 1961), Italian actor and voice actor
Massimo Porrati (born 1961), professor of physics, member of the Center for Cosmology and Particle Physics at New York University
Massimo Pupillo (1922 – c. 1999), Italian film director
Massimo Quiriconi (born 1963), former Italian race walker
 Massimo Ranieri (born Giovanni Calone, 1951), Italian pop singer, film and stage actor
Massimo Rastelli (born 1968), Italian football manager and former player
Massimo Ravazzolo (born 1972), former Italian rugby union player and a current coach
Massimo Rigoni (born 1961), Italian former ski jumper
Massimo Rinaldi (1869–1941), Italian Roman Catholic bishop of Rieti
Massimo Rivola (born 1971), Italian motorsport official
Massimo Rizzo (born 1974), Swiss football manager and former player
Massimo Roccoli (born 1984), Italian motorbike rider
Massimo Rosa (born 1995), Italian and mountain bike racer
Massimo Rosi (born 1944), Italian former swimmer
Massimo Rotundo (born 1955), Italian comics artist
Massimo Sacchetti, eclectic contemporary Italian artist
Massimo Sacchi (born 1950), Italian former swimmer
Massimo Salvadè (born 1971), Italian figure skater
Massimo Salvadori (1908–1992), British-Italian historian and anti-Fascist
Massimo Sammartino (born 1995), Italian footballer
Massimo Sandi (born 2002), Peruvian footballer
Massimo De Santis (born 1962), Italian football referee
Massimo Sarmi (born 1948), Italian businessman
 Massimo Savić (born  1962), Croatian pop singer, also known mononymously as Massimo
Massimo Scaglione (1931–2015), Italian television director, writer and politician
Massimo Scali (born 1979), Italian former competitive ice dancer
Massimo Scaligero (1906–1980), an Italian spiritual teacher and member of "Gruppo di Ur"
Massimo Scarpa (born 1970), Italian professional golfer
Massimo Scolari (born 1943), Italian architect, painter and designer
Massimo Serato, born Giuseppe Segato, (1916–1989), Italian film actor
Massimo Sica, convicted triple murderer
Massimo Sigala (born 1951), Italian former racing driver and co-founder of the Trident Racing
Massimo Silva (born 1951), Italian professional football coach and a former player
Massimo Stano (born 1992), Italian racewalker
Massimo Stanzione (1585–1656), Italian Baroque painter
Massimo Storgato (born 1961), Italian professional football coach and a former player
Massimo Strazzer (born 1969), former Italian professional cyclist
 Massimo Sulli (born 1963), Italian Olympic judoka
Massimo Susic (born 1967), Italian former professional footballer
Massimo Taibi (born 1970), Italian former professional footballer
Massimo Tamburini (1943–2014), Italian motorcycle designer for Cagiva, Ducati, and MV Agusta
Michele Massimo Tarantini (born 1942), Italian film director
Massimo Tarantino (born 1971), retired Italian professional football player
Massimo Tazzer (born 1999), Italian professional footballer
Massimo Teglio (1900–1990), Italian aviator
Massimo Teodori (born 1938), Italian author and politician
Massimo Terzano (1892–1947), Italian cinematographer
Massimo Tononi (born 1964), Italian banker and politician
Massimo Trella (1932–2002), Italian engineer
Massimo Trevisan (born 1968), Italian former freestyle Olympic swimmer
Massimo Troiano (died 1570), Italian composer, poet, chronicler of life at the court of Duke Albrecht V of Bavaria
 Massimo Troisi (1953–1994), Italian actor, screenwriter, and film director
Massimo Santoro Tubito (born 1660), Italian priest and writer
Massimo Andrea Ugolini (born 1978), politician and Captain Regent of San Marino
Massimo Urbani (1957–1993), Italian jazz alto saxophonist
Massimo Valeri (born 1972), former professional tennis player from Italy
Massimo Vanni (born 1946), Italian film and television actor
Massimo Venier (born 1967), Italian film director and screenwriter
Massimo Venturiello (born 1957), Italian actor and voice actor
Massimo Vergassola, Italian physicist, currently at University of California
Massimo Vigliar (born 1949), Italian film producer
 Massimo Vignelli (1931–2014), Italian designer
Massimo Vitali (born 1944), Italian photographer
Massimo Volta (born 1987), Italian professional footballer
Massimo Wertmüller (born 1956), Italian actor
Massimo Wilde (1944–2017), Italian politician
Massimo Zanetti (born 1948), Italian entrepreneur and former politician
Massimo Zappino (born 1981), former Brazilian footballer of Italian descent
Massimo Zedda (born 1976), Italian politician, Mayor of Cagliari
Massimo Zucchelli (born 1972), retired Italian alpine skier

Fictional characters 
 Massimo Marone, a fictional character on The Bold and the Beautiful
 Don Massimo Torricelli, one of the main characters, a mafia boss, in 365 Days.

See also 

 Massimo (surname)

Italian-language surnames
Italian masculine given names
Sammarinese given names